Ubiquitin-conjugating enzyme E2 C is a protein that in humans is encoded by the UBE2C gene.

The modification of proteins with ubiquitin is an important cellular mechanism for targeting abnormal or short-lived proteins for degradation. Ubiquitination involves at least three classes of enzymes: ubiquitin-activating enzymes, or E1s, ubiquitin-conjugating enzymes, or E2s, and ubiquitin-protein ligases, or E3s. This gene encodes a member of the E2 ubiquitin-conjugating enzyme family. This enzyme is required for the destruction of mitotic cyclins and for cell cycle progression. Multiple alternatively spliced transcript variants have been found for this gene, but the full-length nature of some variants has not been defined.

References

Further reading